The Hemlock Society (sometimes called Hemlock Society USA) was an American right-to-die and assisted suicide advocacy organization which existed from 1980 to 2003. It was co-founded in Santa Monica, California by British author and activist Derek Humphry, his wife Ann Wickett Humphry and Gerald A. Larue. It relocated to Oregon in 1988 and, according to Humphry, had several homes over the course of its life. The group took its name from Conium maculatum, a highly poisonous biennial herbaceous flowering plant in the carrot family. The name was a direct reference to the method by which the Athenian philosopher Socrates took his life in 399 BC, as described in Plato's Phaedo.

The Hemlock Society's primary mission included providing information to the dying and supporting legislation permitting physician-assisted suicide. Its motto was "Good Life, Good Death". In 2003, the national organization renamed itself End of Life Choices. In 2004, some former members of the Hemlock Society, notably Derek Humphry and Faye Girsh, founded the Final Exit Network. It took its name from Humphry's 1991 book of the same name.

In 2003, the Hemlock Society changed its name to End-of-Life Choices. In 2004, End-of-Life Choices merged with Compassion in Dying, which is now known as Compassion and Choices. Several local and state organizations, including the Hemlock Society of Florida and the Hemlock Society of San Diego, have retained the Hemlock Society name. Others, such as the Hemlock Society of Illinois (now Final Options Illinois), have changed their names.

Name
According to former president Faye Girsh, the Hemlock Society was founded in 1980 and was named in reference to Socrates' decision to end his life by drinking hemlock rather than succumbing to an existence he found intolerable. In the fifth century B.C., Socrates was convicted of corrupting the youth of Athens by encouraging ideas seen as contrary to the Athenian regime. Though he was sentenced to death, Socrates could have chosen exile, but chose death, an act seen as dignified and noble by many supporters of assisted suicide.

History
Earlier right-to-die advocacy organizations, such as the Euthanasia Educational Council (which formed in 1967 and changed its name to Concern for Dying in 1978), predated the Hemlock Society.

The Hemlock Society was started in 1980 after the success of Derek Humphry's book Jean's Way (1978), which recounted how Humphry assisted his wife in committing suicide on 29 March 1975 after a long battle with cancer. Due to the success of Jean's Way, Humphry had received many letters from people asking for information about assisted suicide. He decided to start the Hemlock Society in an effort to campaign for a change in law and educate the terminally ill on assisted suicide and its methods. Initially started in Humphry's garage in Santa Monica, California, the group eventually moved to Eugene, Oregon, and had many other homes.

Let Me Die Before I Wake, Humphry's book on the methods of assisted suicide, was originally published for members of the Hemlock Society. Due to library and trade demand, the book was published for the market in 1982 and became part of the foundation for the Hemlock Society's reputation and income. In 1991, Humphry published Final Exit, subtitled "The Practicalities of Self-Deliverance and Assisted Suicide for the Dying". The book was a bestseller, though there were calls for it to be banned. After the success of Final Exit, Humphry left the Hemlock Society and started Euthanasia Research and Guidance Organization in 1992.

The Society was a founding charter member of the World Federation of Right to Die Societies, which began in 1980 in Oxford, England, and was led by Sidney D. Rosoff and Humphry. 

The Society's national membership grew to include 40,000 individuals and eighty chapters.

The Society backed legislative efforts in California, Washington, Michigan, and Maine without success until the Oregon Death with Dignity Act was passed on October 27, 1997.

Past Hemlock Society USA presidents included Gerald A. Larue, Derek Humphry, Sidney D. Rosoff, Wiley Morrison, Arthur Metcalfe, John Westover, Faye J. Girsh. Past executive directors included Derek Humphry (acting 1980–1992), Cheryl K. Smith (1992–1993), John A. Pridonoff (1993–1995), Helen Voorhis (acting 1995–1996), and Faye J. Girsh (1996–2000).

In the media
In the 2010 television film You Don’t Know Jack, which dramatizes the activism of former Oakland County, Michigan pathologist Dr. Jack Kevorkian, fellow activist Janet Good (played by Susan Sarandon) meets Kevorkian (played by Al Pacino) during a meeting of the eastern Michigan chapter of the Hemlock Society which Good has organized. Good later offers to let Kevorkian use her home as the location of the assisted suicide of his first patient, Janet Adkins, but later withdraws the offer because her husband Ray, a former member of the Detroit Police Department, questions the legality of assisted suicide in the state. It forces Kevorkian to use his Volkswagen camper van instead. Good is later stricken with pancreatic cancer and, on August 26, 1997, becomes Kevorkian's 82nd patient. Oakland County deputy medical examiner Kanu Virani, however, later said Good did not have cancer.

See also
 Compassion & Choices
 Oregon Death with Dignity Act
 Right to Die
 World Federation of Right to Die Societies

References

The archives of the Hemlock Society and Derek Humphry are at the Allen Library, University of Washington, Seattle, United States

Bibliography
 
 
 
 
 
 
 
 Farewell to Hemlock: Killed by its name, an essay by Derek Humphry 21 February 2005

External links
 Final Exit, website of Derek Humphry
 Hemlock Foundation of Florida Inc.
 Hemlock Society of San Diego
 Compassion & Choices

Assisted suicide